Tazeh Kand-e Qaterchi (also Romanized as Tāzeh Kand-e Qāţerchī) is a village in Nazluchay Rural District, Nazlu District, Urmia County, West Azerbaijan Province, Iran. At the 2006 census, its population was 283, in 78 families.

References 

Populated places in Urmia County